Vasile Neagu (born 9 September 1940) is a Romanian boxer. He competed in the men's welterweight event at the 1960 Summer Olympics.

References

1940 births
Living people
Romanian male boxers
Olympic boxers of Romania
Boxers at the 1960 Summer Olympics
People from Vaslui County
Welterweight boxers